The WA postcode area, also known as the Warrington postcode area, is a group of sixteen postcode districts in North West England, within nine post towns. These cover north Cheshire (including Warrington, Frodsham, Knutsford, Lymm, Runcorn and Widnes), eastern Merseyside (including St Helens and Newton-le-Willows) and small parts of Greater Manchester (including Altrincham).



Coverage
The approximate coverage of the postcode districts:

|-
! WA1
| WARRINGTON
| Warrington, Town Centre, Woolston, Paddington, Orford
| Warrington
|-
! WA2
| WARRINGTON
| Warrington, Dallam, Longford, Orford, Padgate, Winwick
| Warrington
|-
! WA3
| WARRINGTON
| Lowton, Golborne, Birchwood, Rixton with Glazebrook, Culcheth, Astley (part), Lately Common (part)
| Wigan, Warrington
|-
! WA4
| WARRINGTON
| Warrington, Latchford, Stockton Heath, Appleton, Grappenhall, Daresbury, Moore, Walton, Preston on the Hill, Whitley, Dutton, Antrobus (part)
| Warrington, Halton, Cheshire West and Chester

|-
! WA5
| WARRINGTON
| Warrington, Burtonwood, Westbrook, Penketh, Great Sankey, White Cross
| Warrington
|-
! WA6
| FRODSHAM
| Frodsham, Helsby
| Cheshire West and Chester
|-
! WA7
| RUNCORN
| Runcorn
| Halton
|-
! WA8
| WIDNES
| Widnes, Cronton
| Halton, Knowsley
|-
! WA9
| ST. HELENS
| Clock Face, Sutton, Thatto Heath
| St Helens
|-
! WA10
| ST. HELENS
| Eccleston, St. Helens, West Park
| St Helens
|-
! WA11
| ST. HELENS
| Crank, Haydock, Moss Bank, Rainford
| St Helens
|-
! WA12
| NEWTON-LE-WILLOWS
| Newton-le-Willows, Earlestown
| St Helens
|-
! WA13
| LYMM
| Lymm, Statham, Warburton
| Warrington, Trafford
|-
! WA14
| ALTRINCHAM
| Altrincham (centre and west), Bowdon, Broadheath, Dunham Town, Timperley, Dunham Massey, Little Bollington
| Trafford, Cheshire East
|-
! WA15
| ALTRINCHAM
| Altrincham (east), Ashley, Hale, Hale Barns, Timperley, Ringway
| Trafford, Manchester, Cheshire East
|-
! WA16
| KNUTSFORD
| High Legh, Knutsford, Mobberley, Ollerton, Aston by Budworth (part)
| Cheshire East, Cheshire West and Chester
|-
! style="background:#FFFFFF;"|WA55
| style="background:#FFFFFF;"|WARRINGTON
| style="background:#FFFFFF;"|
| style="background:#FFFFFF;"|non-geographic
|-
! style="background:#FFFFFF;"|WA88
| style="background:#FFFFFF;"|WIDNES
| style="background:#FFFFFF;"|
| style="background:#FFFFFF;"|non-geographic
|}

The Frodsham post town was introduced in June 1999; the post town for WA6 had previously been Warrington.

Map

See also
Postcode Address File
List of postcode areas in the United Kingdom

References

External links
 Royal Mail's Postcode Address File
A quick introduction to Royal Mail's Postcode Address File (PAF)
Postcodes of Greater Manchester

Warrington
St Helens, Merseyside
Metropolitan Borough of St Helens
Postcode areas covering North West England